Sams Corner is a census-designated place (CDP) in Mayes County, Oklahoma, United States. The population was 137 at the 2010 census, compared to 126 at the 2000 census.

Geography
Sams Corner is located at  (36.199908, -95.219233).

Demographics

As of the census of 2000, there were 126 people, 53 households, and 39 families residing in the CDP. The population density was 131.6 people per square mile (50.7/km2). There were 56 housing units at an average density of 58.5/sq mi (22.5/km2). The racial makeup of the CDP was 65.87% White, 30.16% Native American, and 3.97% from two or more races.

There were 53 households, out of which 39.6% had children under the age of 18 living with them, 58.5% were married couples living together, 9.4% had a female householder with no husband present, and 26.4% were non-families. 24.5% of all households were made up of individuals, and 11.3% had someone living alone who was 65 years of age or older. The average household size was 2.38 and the average family size was 2.85.

In the CDP, the population was spread out, with 25.4% under the age of 18, 6.3% from 18 to 24, 29.4% from 25 to 44, 23.8% from 45 to 64, and 15.1% who were 65 years of age or older. The median age was 40 years. For every 100 females, there were 103.2 males. For every 100 females age 18 and over, there were 100.0 males.

The median income for a household in the CDP was $35,000, and the median income for a family was $53,309. Males had a median income of $34,412 versus $20,368 for females. The per capita income for the CDP was $15,980. There were 20.5% of families and 18.9% of the population living below the poverty line, including 41.7% of under eighteens and none of those over 64.

References

Census-designated places in Mayes County, Oklahoma
Census-designated places in Oklahoma